Hata Teruo (Japanese: 秦 テルヲ; 20 March 1887, Hiroshima – 25 December 1945, Kyoto) was a Japanese painter and graphic artist. In his works, he attempted to synthesize the nihonga and yōga styles. Many of his later works have Buddhist themes.

Life and work 
His family was apparently Christian. He lost his father at the age of nine, which resulted in straitened economic circumstances. Nevertheless, he was able to graduate from the Municipal School of Arts and Crafts (now the Kyoto City University of Arts); intending to become an industrial designer to support his family. At first, he painted in Kyoto and Kōbe, focusing on scenes from the hard lives of the working poor and their meager living quarters. In 1909, he joined an organization of young painters known as the "Heigo Group", named after one of the Heavenly Stems in the sexagenary cycle, meaning "To Strike". 

Following the breakup of that group, he never joined any others.

After 1914 he led a restless life, living in Osaka, Kōbe and Tokyo, where he painted bleak industrial scenes and graphic portraits of prostitutes. Following a serious illness in 1919, he got  married and when his first child was born, in 1921, he settled in the village of Kamo. At that time, he became interested in the works of Paul Gauguin and began to create paintings with Buddhist themes, having become disillusioned with Christianity. In 1929, he moved into central Kyoto. During the Pacific War he focused on small drawings; mostly with a melancholy content.

He is now remembered largely for his idiosyncratic portrayals of mothers and their children.

Sources 
"Hata Teruo" In: Kyōto no Nihonga 1910–1930, (exhibition catalog) National Museum of Modern Art, Kyoto, 1986. .
 Laurance P. Roberts: "Hata Teruo". In: A Dictionary of Japanese Artists. Weatherhill, 1976. .

Further reading
 John D. Szostak, " Two Paths to the Pure Land: The Niga-byakudō Theme and the Modernist Buddhist Art of Hada Teruo",  Archives of Asian Art, Vol. 57 (2007), pp. 121–150

External links 

 Selected drawings in the collection of the National Museum of Modern Art, Tokyo.

1887 births
1945 deaths
Nihonga painters
Buddhist artists
Artists from Kyoto
Yōga painters